The finals and the qualifying heats of the women's 100 metre butterfly event at the 1998 World Aquatics Championships were held on Thursday 15 January 1998 in Perth, Western Australia.

A Final

B Final

Qualifying heats

See also
1996 Women's Olympic Games 100m Butterfly (Atlanta)
1997 Women's World SC Championships 100m Butterfly (Gothenburg)
1997 Women's European LC Championships 100m Butterfly (Seville)
2000 Women's Olympic Games 100m Butterfly (Sydney)

References

Women's 100 metre butterfly
Swimming at the 1998 World Aquatics Championships
1998 in women's swimming